Tequatrovirus is a genus of viruses in the order Caudovirales, in the family Myoviridae, in the subfamily Tevenvirinae. Gram-negative bacteria serve as the natural host, with transmission achieved through passive diffusion. There are 75 species in this genus.

Taxonomy
The following species are assigned to the genus:

Citrobacter virus CrRp10
Citrobacter virus PhiZZ6
Citrobacter virus PhiZZ23
Enterobacteria virus Aplg8
Enterobacteria virus GiZh
Enterobacteria virus IME340
Enterobacteria virus Kha5h
Enterobacteria virus RB18
Enterobacteria virus RB27
Enterobacteria virus T6
Escherichia virus AR1
Escherichia virus AREG1
Escherichia virus C40
Escherichia virus CF2
Escherichia virus DalCa
Escherichia virus E112
Escherichia virus EC121
Escherichia virus ECML134
Escherichia virus EcNP1
Escherichia virus ECO4
Escherichia virus EcoMF1
Escherichia virus F2
Escherichia virus fFiEco06
Escherichia virus G8
Escherichia virus G28
Escherichia virus G50
Escherichia virus G4498
Escherichia virus G4507
Escherichia virus G9062
Escherichia virus HY01
Escherichia virus HY03
Escherichia virus Ime09
Escherichia virus IME537
Escherichia virus KAW1E185
Escherichia virus KIT03
Escherichia virus Lutter
Escherichia virus NBEco003
Escherichia virus NBG2
Escherichia virus OE5505
Escherichia virus Ozark
Escherichia virus PD112
Escherichia virus PE37
Escherichia virus PP01
Escherichia virus RB3
Escherichia virus RB14
Escherichia virus RB32
Escherichia virus slur03
Escherichia virus slur04
Escherichia virus T2
Escherichia virus T4
Escherichia virus teqdroes
Escherichia virus teqhad
Escherichia virus teqskov
Escherichia virus YUEEL01
Salmonella virus SG1
Salmonella virus SNUABM-01
Serratia virus PhiZZ30
Shigella virus CM8
Shigella virus JK45
Shigella virus pSs1
Shigella virus Sf21
Shigella virus Sf22
Shigella virus Sf23
Shigella virus Sf24
Shigella virus SH7
Shigella virus SHBML501
Shigella virus SHBML-50-1
Shigella virus Shfl2
Shigella virus SHFML11
Shigella virus SHFML26
Yersinia virus D1
Yersinia virus fPS-2
Yersinia virus PST
Yersinia virus PYPS2T
Yersinia virus ZN18

Structure
Tequatrovirus species are nonenveloped, with a head and tail. The head is a prolate spheroid approximately 120 nm in length and 86 nm in width, with an elongated icosahedral symmetry (T=13, Q=21) composed of 152 total capsomers. The tail has six long terminal fibers, six short spikes, and a small base plate. The tail is enclosed in a sheath, which loosens and slides around the tail core upon contraction.

Genome
Genomes are linear, around 169kb in length. The genome codes for 300 proteins. Some species have been fully sequenced and are available from ICTV. They range between 159k and 235k nucleotides, with 242 to 292 proteins. The complete genomes are available from  the National Center for Biotechnology Information, along with the complete genomes for dozens of other similar, unclassified virus strains.

Life cycle
Viral replication is cytoplasmic. The virus attaches to the host cell using its terminal fibers, and uses viral exolysin to degrade the cell wall enough to eject the viral DNA into the host cytoplasm via contraction of its tail sheath. DNA-templated transcription is the method of transcription. The virus exits the host cell by lysis, and holin/endolysin/spanin proteins. Once the viral genes have been replicated, the procapsid is assembled and packed. The tail is then assembled and the mature virions are released via lysis. Gram-negative bacteria serve as the natural host. Transmission routes are passive diffusion.

History
The ICTV's first report (1971) included the genus T-even phages, unassigned to an order, family, or subfamily. The genus was renamed in 1976 to T-even phage group, moved into the newly created family Myoviridae in 1981. In 1993, it was renamed again to T4-like phages, and was moved into the newly created order Caudovirales in 1998. The next year (1999), it was renamed to T4-like viruses. Once more, the genus was moved into the newly created subfamily Tevenvirinae in 2010-11, renamed to T4likevirus in 2012, and renamed again to T4virus in 2015. The proposals before 1993, and from 1998 are unavailable online. The other proposals are available here: 1993, 1999, 2010, 2012.

References

External links
 Viralzone: T4virus
 ICTV

Tevenvirinae
Virus genera